Ferryland is a provincial electoral district for the House of Assembly of Newfoundland and Labrador, Canada. As of 2011, there are 8,571 eligible voters living within the district.

This was the most strongly anti-Confederation area of the province in the late 1940s, but turned Liberal in the 1950s and 1960s. It is historically a fishing district, but tourism has been growing. Ferryland contains part of the City of St. John's in the area of Lower Goulds as well as the communities of: Admiral's Cove, Aquaforte, Bay Bulls, Bauline East, Biscay Bay, Brigus South, Burnt Cove, Calvert, Cape Broyle, Cappahayden, Daniel's Point, Fermeuse, Ferryland, Kingman's Cove, La Manche, Mobile, Petty Harbour–Maddox Cove, Port Kirwan, Portugal Cove South, Renews, St. Michael's, St. Shotts, Tors Cove, Trepassey and Witless Bay. The district is considered a Progressive Conservative (PC) stronghold.

Bordering districts include Conception Bay South, Harbour Main, Mount Pearl-Southlands, Placentia-St. Mary's and Waterford Valley.

Members of the House of Assembly
The district has elected the following Members of the House of Assembly:

Election results 

|-

|-
 
|NDP
|Chris Molloy	
|align="right"|1.224
|align="right"|24.26
|align="right"|+17.35
|-

|}

|-

|-

|-
 
|NDP
|Grace Bavington
|align="right"|351
|align="right"|6.91%
|align="right"|+1.95%
|}

|-

|-

|-
 
|NDP
|Rick Boland
|align="right"|183
|align="right"|4.96%
|align="right"|-0.19%
|}

|-

|-

|-
 
|NDP
|Lois Martin
|align="right"|309 
|align="right"|5.15
|align="right"|
|-

|Independent
|Pilar Riego-Hickey
|align="right"|11 
|align="right"|0.18
|align="right"|
|}

 
|NDP
|Gerry Ryan
|align="right"|147
|align="right"|2.2%
|align="right"|
|-
|}

|-

|-

|}

|-

|-

 
|NDP
|V Silk
|align="right"|166
|align="right"|0.32%
|align="right"|
|}

References

External links 
Newfoundland and Labrador House of Assembly

Newfoundland and Labrador provincial electoral districts
Politics of St. John's, Newfoundland and Labrador